Sterling Brown may refer to:

 Sterling Allen Brown (1901–1989), American academic, poet and writer
 Sterling K. Brown (born 1976), American actor
 Sterling Brown (American football) (born c. 1938), American football coach
 Sterling Brown (basketball) (born 1995), American basketball player

See also
 Sterling Brown Hendricks (1902–1981), American agriculturist